Lamprogrammus is a genus of cusk-eels.

Species
There are currently five recognized species in this genus:
 Lamprogrammus brunswigi (A. B. Brauer, 1906)
 Lamprogrammus exutus Nybelin & Poll, 1958 (Legless cuskeel)
 Lamprogrammus fragilis Alcock, 1892
 Lamprogrammus niger Alcock, 1891
 Lamprogrammus shcherbachevi Cohen & Rohr, 1993 (Scaleline cusk)

References

Ophidiidae
Marine fish genera
Taxa named by Alfred William Alcock